Kayseri Kadın FK is a women's football team based in Kayseri, Turkey playing in the Turkish Women's Football Super League. They are called also as Yukatel Kayseri Kadın F.K.

History
They were formed in 2015 as part of the 1997-established Kayseri Gençler Birliği (literally: Kayseri Youth Union). The club's current chairman is Ünal Çankaya. The team was promoted from the Women's Second League after the 2019–20 season.

Stadium
The team play home matches at Vali Nihat Canpolat Sümer Facility, Field No. 2 in Kocasinan district of Kayseri Province.

Statistics
.

 (1): Promoted after the incomplete season by TFF decision according to point average
 (2): Season in progress

Current squad
.

Head coach:  Sercan Erdoğan

References

Association football clubs established in 1997
Association football clubs established in 2015
1997 establishments in Turkey
2015 establishments in Turkey
Football clubs in Kayseri
Sport in Kayseri
Women's football clubs in Turkey